Urodacus carinatus is a species of scorpion in the Urodacidae family. It is native to central Australia, and was first described in 1911 by British arachnologist Arthur Stanley Hirst.

References

 

 
carinatus
Scorpions of Australia
Endemic fauna of Australia
Fauna of the Northern Territory
Animals described in 1911
Taxa named by Arthur Stanley Hirst